The Racket may refer to:

Film, television and theatre
The Racket (play), a 1927 Broadway crime play by Bartlett Cormack
The Racket (1928 film), an American adaptation of the play, directed by Lewis Milestone
The Racket (1951 film), an American remake of the 1928 film, starring Robert Mitchum
"The Racket" (Vinyl), a 2016 TV episode

Other uses
The Racket (book), a 2015 book by Matthew Kennard
The Racket (radio program), an Australian heavy metal program

See also
Racket (disambiguation)